John Graham Pugh (born 12 February 1948 in Chester, Cheshire) is an English former professional footballer who played in the Football League as a midfielder for Sheffield Wednesday, Huddersfield Town, Chester, Barnsley and Scunthorpe United in the 1960s, 1970s and 1980s. He played in the 1966 FA Cup Final for Sheffield Wednesday, losing to Everton.

References

1948 births
Living people
Sportspeople from Chester
English footballers
England under-23 international footballers
Association football midfielders
Sheffield Wednesday F.C. players
Huddersfield Town A.F.C. players
Chester City F.C. players
Barnsley F.C. players
Scunthorpe United F.C. players
Matlock Town F.C. players
English Football League players
FA Cup Final players